Much Ado About Nothing is a comedy by William Shakespeare.

Much Ado About Nothing may also refer to:
 Much Ado About Nothing (1973 film)
 BBC Television Shakespeare – Season Seven – Much Ado About Nothing (1984) directed by Stuart Burge
 Much Ado About Nothing (1993 film)
 Much Ado About Nothing (2012 film)
 Much Ado About Nothing (2016 film)
 Much Ado About Nothing (opera)

See also
"Much Ado About Boimler", Star Trek: Lower Decks episode
"Much Ado About Mousing", Tom and Jerry cartoon
"Much Ado About Nutting", Merry Melodies cartoon
"Much Ado About Scrooge", DuckTales episode
"Much Apu About Nothing", The Simpsons episode
"Much 'I Do' About Nothing", Gossip Girl episode